Brownell is a city in Ness County, Kansas,  United States.  As of the 2020 census, the population of the city was 23.

History
Brownell was a station on the Missouri Pacific Railroad. The community was named for Mr. Brownell, a railroad official.

The first post office in Brownell was established in 1880, but the post office was called Vansburgh until 1888.

Geography
Brownell is located at  (38.639630, -99.745801).

Climate
The climate in this area is characterized by hot, humid summers and generally mild to cool winters.  According to the Köppen Climate Classification system, Brownell has a humid subtropical climate, abbreviated "Cfa" on climate maps.

Demographics

2010 census
As of the census of 2010, there were 29 people, 16 households, and 8 families residing in the city. The racial makeup of the city was 100.0% White.

There were 16 households, of which 12.5% had children under the age of 18 living with them, 50.0% were married couples living together, and 50.0% were non-families. 50.0% of all households were made up of individuals, and 18.8% had someone living alone who was 65 years of age or older. The average household size was 1.81 and the average family size was 2.63.

The median age in the city was 59.5 years. 17.2% of residents were under the age of 18; 0.0% were between the ages of 18 and 24; 10.3% were from 25 to 44; 37.8% were from 45 to 64; and 34.5% were 65 years of age or older. The gender makeup of the city was 58.6% male and 41.4% female.

2000 census
As of the census of 2000, there were 48 people, 23 households, and 14 families residing in the city. The racial makeup of the city was 97.92% White, and 2.08% from two or more races.

There were 23 households, out of which 13.0% had children under the age of 18 living with them, 56.5% were married couples living together, and 34.8% were non-families. 30.4% of all households were made up of individuals, and 17.4% had someone living alone who was 65 years of age or older. The average household size was 2.09 and the average family size was 2.53.

In the city, the population was spread out, with 14.6% under the age of 18, 8.3% from 18 to 24, 10.4% from 25 to 44, 35.4% from 45 to 64, and 31.3% who were 65 years of age or older. The median age was 51 years. For every 100 females, there were 152.6 males. For every 100 females age 18 and over, there were 127.8 males.

The median income for a household in the city was $36,250, and the median income for a family was $43,750. Males had a median income of $25,000 versus $28,750 for females. The per capita income for the city was $14,765. There were 23.5% of families and 28.8% of the population living below the poverty line, including 57.1% of under eighteens and none of those over 64.

Education
The community is served by Western Plains USD 106 public school district. The Western Plains High School mascot is Bobcats.

Brownell became a part of the Ransom school district in 1960. The Brownell School closed in 1969. USD 106 formed in 2004 by the consolidation of Ransom USD 302 and Bazine USD 304.

Parks and Recreation
 Cedar Bluff Reservoir and Cedar Bluff State Park

Notable people
 Elon Hogsett, Major League Baseball pitcher

References

Further reading

External links
 Brownell - Directory of Public Officials
 Brownell city map, KDOT

Cities in Kansas
Cities in Ness County, Kansas